Ashti is a small village on the banks of the Jagbudi River in the region of the Western Ghats (also known as the Sahyadri mountains, in the Indian state of Maharashtra.

The population of Ashti is 2000, with around 150 dwellings. Most of the people are engaged in farming and fisheries, but some have also expatriated to countries in the Middle East and Africa to work. The main religion followed is Islam.

Education
There are two schools in Ashti. One is an English Medium primary school named National English School, and the other is a government-run Urdu medium secondary school.

Transport and communication
In addition to being connected to Khed via ST Bus Service, boat services are also available through Ashti Port (Pakti) which connects Ashti to Aamshet.

Surnames
Some of the people living here have surnames like Gondhlekar, Rawal, Bijle, Chougle, Jasnaik, Maldolkar, Parkar, Arawkar, Sange, Khatib, Sain, Bukhari, Inarkar and Nilikkar.

Climate
The climate is cool and pleasant during the months between November and February. The rainy season lasts from June to September.

See also

 Bahirwali
 Bhoste
 Karji
 Kondivali
 Ratnagiri
 Savnas
 Shirshi

References

External links
 Aerial view of the village

Villages in Ratnagiri district